The 2012–13 UAE President's Cup is the 37th season of the UAE President's Cup, the premier knockout tournament for association football clubs in the United Arab Emirates. The reigning champions are Al Jazira, having won their second title last season. The winners will qualify for the group stage of the 2014 AFC Champions League.

After a change to the format last season garnered criticism for not including as many lower-league teams, the format has now returned to a previous format. 14 teams from UAE Division 1 Group A and Group B took place in a group stage with 2 groups of four and 2 groups of three, with the group winners advancing to a play-off stage.  The two winners of the play-off matches will join the 14 Pro-League teams in the round of 16.

First round

Group A

Group B

Group C

Group D

Second round
The four group winners from the first round entered at this stage.

The winners of each match advanced to the round of 16.

Third round
The two winning teams from the second round join the 14 Pro-League teams in this round. The games took place on 19, 20 and 21 December 2012.

Quarter finals
The eight winning teams from the third round advance to the Quarter Finals, played on 2, 10 and 11 February.

Semi finals

Final

References

UAE President's Cup seasons
Uae President's Cup